Notre-Dame-des-Anges is a parish municipality in Quebec, Canada, home of the General Hospital of Quebec.

Enclaved within the territory of Quebec City, this unusual municipality had a population of 241 and measures only 6 hectares (15 acres) in area, making it the smallest incorporated municipal entity in Canada. With a density of  according to Statistics Canada, it is the second densest census subdivision in Canada.

It lacks any governmental structure and has no mayor but rather an "administrator."

History

The land near the Saint-Charles River was first possessed as a fief by the Recollect Friars Minor, who built the Friary of St. Charles there around 1620. The Recollects were expelled by the British in 1629. The seigneury then passed to the Jesuits in late 1629, after the return of the friars to France following the capitulation of Quebec to the Kirk brothers by Champlain on 14 September 1629.  The property was returned to the Recollects upon their return to New France in 1670, at which time they dedicated their house to Notre-Dame-des-Anges (Our Lady of the Angels), so named for the first community of the Franciscan Order.

In 1692, it was purchased by Jean-Baptiste de Saint-Vallier, Bishop of Quebec, to found a hospital, which he did the subsequent year. In 1722, it was established as a civil parish and in 1855, the parish municipality was officially founded with the goal of protecting its sole occupant, the Hôpital général de Québec, from taxes.

Geography

The municipality is situated north of downtown Quebec City, enclaved within the borough of La Cité-Limoilou, bounded by avenue Simon-Napoléon-Parent, rue des Commissaires Ouest, and rue Saint-Anselme.

It is entirely occupied by the Hôpital Général de Québec, including the CLSC Basse-Ville–Limoilou–Vanier, and by the various religious buildings associated with the hospital, including an Augustine monastery, the Église de Notre-Dame-des-Anges (the parish church), and a museum. The hospital is surrounded by a cemetery holding, among others, the remains of General Louis-Joseph de Montcalm.

It is one of two enclaves in Quebec City (along with the Wendake Indian reserve) that was not subject to the municipal mergers in 2002. It is also by far the smallest municipality not included in one of Quebec's Regional County Municipalities.

Demographics 

See also
Saint-Louis-de-Gonzague-du-Cap-Tourmente

References

External links

Commission de toponymie du Québec -- Topos sur le Web (French)
Notre-Dame-des-Anges -- Ministère des Affaires municipales et des Régions (French)
La Miséricorde de Jésus de l'Hôpital Général de Québec Augustine Community (English)
Notre-Dame-des-Anges - ePodunk (includes map)

Parish municipalities in Quebec
Incorporated places in Capitale-Nationale
French colonial architecture in Canada
Catholic missions of New France